Final Fantasy XIV: Endwalker is the fourth expansion pack to Final Fantasy XIV, a massively multiplayer online role-playing game (MMORPG) developed and published by Square Enix for macOS, PlayStation 4, PlayStation 5, and Windows. It was released on December 7, 2021, over two years after Shadowbringers, the previous expansion, with its production delayed by the COVID-19 pandemic. Like its predecessors, Naoki Yoshida served as director and producer and Masayoshi Soken composed the soundtrack. The expansion pack was released as a standalone product for current players; for new players, the "Complete Edition" that originally launched with Heavensward was updated to include all expansions including Endwalker.

In Endwalker, players as the Warrior of Light travel to the secluded nation of Sharlayan to seek help in handling the approaching Final Days, an apocalyptic event that threatens to destroy the entire world. Meanwhile, Zenos, the mad son of the former emperor of Garlemald, has murdered his father and now seeks a final confrontation with the Warrior of Light. Zenos is assisted by the nihilistic Ascian Fandaniel, who wants the Final Days to occur so everyone, himself included, is wiped out. The story has been marketed as the "finale" of the Hydaelyn–Zodiark arc, drawing the current ongoing story since A Realm Reborn to a close, with an entirely new story beginning in the major patches following release, in contrast to past expansion's stories continuing into midway through the post-release patches. In addition to adding new areas, the expansion pack increases the level cap to 90 and debuts two new Final Fantasy "jobs", Sage and Reaper among other changes.

Gameplay

The gameplay and quest structure of Endwalker largely matches that of the base game. As with many MMORPGs, players interact with each other in a persistent world that responds to their actions. Due to ongoing issues with numerical values, such as enemy health pools, growing large enough to threaten overflow errors, Endwalker includes a numeric down-scaling, sometimes colloquially referred to by MMO players as a "stat squish." Two new jobs were introduced as well. The first is Sage, a healer that uses magical objects inspired by Funnels from the Gundam franchise called Nouliths to direct aetheric energy to create barriers and amplify the character's own offense abilities. The second new job, Reaper, is a scythe-wielding armored melee fighter that calls on the aid of an avatar from the void for greater power. Many other jobs have been given changes as well, including a complete rework of the Summoner job, a major update to the Monk job, and various new abilities for other jobs.

A player versus player (PvP) overhaul also debuted in Endwalker, with PvP abilities for all jobs being completely reworked to be more streamlined. A new "small-scale" PvP gamemode called Crystalline Conflict launched in the 6.1 update,. This also comes with the cessation of the former "Feast" gamemode, with rewards from the Feast now being available to be obtained from playing Crystalline Conflict.

Estinien, a character who formally joined the player's allies in the lead-up to Endwalker, was added as an option for the Trust system that debuted in Shadowbringers, and a later update added the ability to use the trust system in A Realm Reborn and Heavensward dungeons, with plans to include Stormblood dungeons as well, to allow all of the Main Story Quest to be almost fully a single player experience. Further new content to come after launch includes Myths of the Realm, a 24-player raid series that explores myths and legends surrounding the twelve deities worshiped by the people of Eorzea, and Pandæmonium, an eight-player raid series focusing on a mysterious location connected to a past villain, Lahabrea. Similar to the changes in Shadowbringers, some Main Story quests have been changed, including removing the trial "Cape Westwind" and replacing it with a single-player instance, while shortening and streamlining the dungeons of "Castrum Meridianum" and "The Praetorium"; the latter has had its last sections—a chain of boss fights against the Ultima Weapon and Lahabrea—split into a different Raid and single player instance respectively.

Patch 6.2 of Endwalker debuted a new system, Island Sanctuary, a farming simulation mode where players can tend a garden on a deserted island, raise livestock, and interact with pets. Island Sanctuary's philosophy is "slow life" and is intended as a relaxing solo pursuit for players without the pressure of competition. Further changes here made to Main Story quests, including removing the trial "The Steps of Faith" and replacing it with a single-player instance, and changing the boss mechanics of several early dungeons such as "The Aery". As of patch 6.1, the existing player housing grew to include a new housing area in the city-state of Ishgard, called the Empyreum. A new lottery-based method of acquiring a house was implemented, alongside assigning a larger number of wards for player guilds called Free Companies, to ameliorate player concerns about the availability issues with the current system. As of patch 6.18, the World Visit system was expanded to allow players to travel to other data centers in their region, greatly increasing the number of players one may connect with. Data centers were also added for the Oceania region, allowing better connections for players in locations such as New Zealand and Australia, rather than having to use Data Centers intended for Japan.

Plot

Main Story

Endwalker opens as the Warrior of Light and Scions sail to Old Sharlayan, and the Warrior converses with Hydaelyn. The Scions split, each group with the Warrior's aid. One examines Sharlayan's history and the artificial Labyrinthos habitat. While doing so, Hydaelyn possesses Krile, and gifts the Warrior of Light a flower that glows near strong emotion. The Scions learn that the Forum has recently focused their energies on the study of the aetherial sea, and that they have accelerated their efforts to gather and disseminate specimens. The Forum catches the Scions, and orders them to stop or be banished.

The other travels to Thavnair, seeking its alchemists, who are developing an anti-tempering charm. They learn that the dragon Vrtra has ruled Thavnair for millennia, hiding behind a figurehead satrap. While testing an anti-tempering ward made from Vrtra's scales, the alchemist Nidhana is captured, and Fandaniel reveals his former identity: the Allagan technologist Amon. The Amon slain during the expedition into the Crystal Tower was one of his clones. Protected by the warding scales, the Scions rescue Nidhana and destory the tempering tower she was imprisoned in. 

Now able to resist tempering, the Scions march on the ruins of Garlemald alongside a detachment of the Grand Companies. Belligerent Garlean holdouts rebuff their aid, but eventually accept. The Scions then assault the Tower of Babil and defeat Anima, a primal derived from Emperor Varis and the source of the Garleans' tempering. Doing so releases almost enough aether to free Zodiark from his prison, forcing Fandaniel and Zenos to travel to the moon to finish the job. Hydaelyn-Krile arrives and tells the Warrior to pursue the duo to the moon, but they are too late: Zodiark is freed. Fandaniel betrays Zenos, merging with Zodiark to fight the Warrior. Although he is defeated, Fandaniel kills himself and Zodiark as planned, restarting the Final Days. Zenos departs, unwilling to duel the Warrior while they are distracted by the oncoming apocalypse.

Some Scions join the Warrior, and a Hydaelyn-made servant called the Watcher explains the moon doubles as an evacuation vessel if the Final Days return. He calls the Warrior's flower an "elpis," bidding them remember this. They learn Hydaelyn created the rabbit-like Loporrits to prepare the moon for evacuating "Etheirys," the star's Ancient name. However, they are woefully ignorant of modern Etheirys, derailing their preparations. They say the other shards' residents cannot be saved, and will die when the Source is destroyed. The heroes eventually persuade the Loporrits to consider other options.

Monsters resembling the first Final Days' horrors assault Thavnair, and the Scions fight back. They later learn that the monsters are created when someone is completely overcome with despair, and killing them erases their aether from existence. The satrap is slain in the chaos, forcing Vrtra to reveal himself. Meanwhile, the Forum officially announces the evacuation of the star and encourages mankind to prepare.

With no leads on the cause of the Final Days, the Warrior goes to the First to consult the lingering essence of Elidibus. He names "Elpis" a place, where new life concepts were safety tested. He recalls the Warrior being in Elpis before the sundering, and thus consumes the last of his soul-energy to send the Warrior back in time to seek Hermes, Fandaniel's identity before he took the seat.

There, the Warrior meets Emet-Selch, Hythlodaeus, and Venat, the previous Azem. Though mistaken for a familiar at first, they are eventually forced to explain their mission; the Ancients, disturbed by the Warrior's tale, agree to help. They seek out Hermes and his empathic creation, Meteion, linked to a collective of identical Meteia sent to distant stars via dynamis (another form of energy, influenced by emotion) to ask other beings what gives life meaning. Every world the Meteia encounter is dead, dying, or destroyed soon after arrival. They conclude that life is suffering, and should end. Meteion departs to join her sisters at the universe's edge, from which their despair will unleash the Final Days. Bitter over his colleagues' casual anthropocentrism and wanting to test mankind's worthiness, Hermes enables Meteion's escape. He tries to erase everyone's memories, but the Warrior and Venat escape; Hermes, Emet-Selch, and Hythlodaeus forget all these events.

Returning to Sharlayan, Alphinaud secures the cooperation of the Forum. Moved by their success, Fourchenault reconciles with his children. He leads the Scions to the Aitiascope, where they can physically enter the aetherial sea. Finally, they reach Hydaelyn. She greets them, revealing Her ages-long plan to stop the Final Days, but the Scions must prove they can defeat Her. The Scions emerge victorious, and Hydaelyn gifts the Warrior some of Her power and a crystal pointing to the Meteia's nest. Further, She reveals that the Mothercrystal is not Her, but a separate, vast repository of aether. Her purpose finally fulfilled, Hydaelyn fades from existence.

Returning to Sharlayan, the Scions board the Forum's evacuation vessel - the Ragnarok. With the help of the newly-lucid beast tribes and the Loporrits, the Scions reach the edge of the universe: Ultima Thule. Meteion intercepts them, nearly killing all aboard, before Thancred sacrifices himself, in the process making Ultima Thule survivable. Exploring the region, they find spectres of dead worlds visited by Meteion. As they proceed through Ultima Thule, the other Scions continue to sacrifice themselves to create a path forward, eventually leaving only the Warrior. Confronting Meteion, they use Azem's crystal, empowered by Hydaelyn's Light, to revive Emet-Selch and Hythlodaeus, who create a field of elpis, radiating hope. This anchors Ultima Thule, allows the Scions to be resurrected, and restores Meteion's original personality. She begs them to stop her sisters. Emet-Selch and Hythlodaeus then willingly die; Emet-Selch assures the Warrior that many further adventures await them.

The Scions pursue Meteion through her memories of dead stars. The Meteia merge into the Endsinger, overpowering them. The Warrior teleports their comrades to safety and, with Zenos' unexpected aid in the form of Shinryu, defeats the Endsinger. Meteion views the Warrior's memories, realizing Hermes' question has no single answer, and departs peacefully. Zenos confronts the Warrior, admitting that their duels are the only thing that makes his life worth living, and insinuating that the Warrior feels the same. The two fight, and The Warrior barely defeats Zenos, who breathes his last. The Warrior nearly dies, but is miraculously saved by a Sharlayan remote teleporter. The Scions narrowly revive them on the way home. Having averted the Final Days and brought peace to Eorzea, the Scions formally disband, but secretly remain connected should the need arise.

New Adventures 
Inspired by Emet-Selch, the Warrior helps Estinien hunt for a legendary undersea vault near Thavnair, joined by Y'shtola, G'raha, and Urianger. They find the treasure, but learn it belongs to Vrtra, as an emergency fund. At Estinien's suggestion, he calls for a reconstruction fund and an orphanage. The vault also houses a tiny fissure leading to the Void, also known as the Thirteenth. Vrtra once sought to expand it, to search for his beloved sister, Azdaja. She had flown through a massive Allagan voidgate to stop their voidsent armies from invading Meracydia. Y'shtola investigates, seeking a means to travel to other shards. Vrtra had long since given up searching, but the Scions rekindle his hopes. The party learns of an way to expand the voidgate via alchemy, and the alchemists set to work. Meanwhile, an armored figure discusses plans of invading the Source, while Zenos' former Reaper avatar declares the Void a world "bereft of saviors."

The alchemists complete their work, as well as a new adult-size body for Vrtra. Protected by reinforced warding scales, the party crosses to a castle in the Void. They best its guardians, including Scarmiglione, archfiend of earth. They meet Zenos' former avatar, revealed by the light of Hydaelyn's final crystal to be a half-voidsent woman. She tells them her story, though only once promised payment in aether: she was exposed to the darkness while still in her mother's womb, during a war called the Contramemoria. Y'shtola gives her a name, "Zero," meaning a beginning rather than nothing. They are surprised by a revived Scarmiglione, who reveals that death is impossible on the Thirteenth. Y'shtola realizes overabundant Darkness prevents souls from travelling to the aetherial sea. After requesting her services in payment for naming her, the Scions permanently slay Scarmiglione using Zero's crystallizing power, called "memoria".

The Echo reveals Azdaja was caught by Golbez, the armored figure, and that she may yet live. Meanwhile, Golbez learns that a "memoriate" may still live, and dispatches Barbariccia, the archfiend of wind, to deal with any issues. The Warrior defeats Barbariccia, and Zero crystallizes her, but collapses from over-exerting herself. The group is forced to fall back to the Source with Zero in tow so she can recuperate. The two remaining archfiends plot a way to draw out and destroy Zero, as she presents a dire threat to them.

Zero recovers on the Source, and offers a legend about the Thirteenth as payment. Long ago, their world was at peace, until the Ascians came, teaching the summoning of primals, called "Eidolons." Memoriates, like Zero and her mother, defeated them and temporarily restored peace. Unfortunately, Darkness leaked from the memoria crystals and corrupted them. They turned on each other, resulting in the Contramemoria War. Eventually, the chaos triggered a Flood of Darkness, erasing most of the world and corrupting all life into voidsent. The Scions surprise Zero by pledging to restore her world. Meanwhile, Golbez muses on his plans, with a flashback showing someone in an Ancient's robes.

As the group prepares to return to the Thirteenth, Vrtra feels Azdaja's presence in the Source in Garlemald. They reunite with Alphinaud and Alisaie, learning that hordes of voidsent have emerged from a Reaper village in the mountains, which they reach with the aid of Garlean engineers. They defeat Cagnazzo, archfiend of water, who reveals that Azdaja's presence in the Source was caused by him opening a voidgate with one of her eyes. The Scions retrieve her aether-depleted eye in hopes that they can use it to find Azdaja.

The group parts ways with the twins and returns to Thavnair, but soon learn that the voidgate at Alzadaal's Legacy was destroyed by a pillar of energy, and that Cagnazzo was a distraction to allow Rubicante, the archfiend of fire, to pass through and attack the Source. The Warrior defeats Rubicante, who reveals to them in an Echo vision that Golbez learned of the Ascians' machinations and the other shards, and plans to invade the Source so that the voidsent may return to the aetherial sea. Before passing, he tells the Warrior to travel to the Thirteenth's moon. The Scions realize that Golbez's plans to shatter the barrier between the Source and the Thirteenth would result in chaos comparable to a calamity, and look for another way to travel to the Thirteenth. Meanwhile, on the Thirteenth's moon, Golbez sets the final stages of his plan in motion.

Development
Planning for expansions like Endwalker begins shortly prior to the release of the preceding expansion with a "scriptwriting retreat" involving producer and director Naoki Yoshida and the main scenario writers, Natsuko Ishikawa and Banri Oda. The story was largely finalized by October 2019. The process for developing an expansion involves laying out the progression from main game to expansion in detail and categorizing these elements so that developers would not get confused between patch content and expansion content which were being created simultaneously. Expansions for Final Fantasy XIV are designed to compete with offline RPGs in length and content. In terms of content, roughly 70% of development time is devoted to standard features common to every expansion, such as new dungeons and classes, and 30% is devoted to creating unique features and modes of gameplay. Development for the PlayStation 5 version of the game was part of the latter 30%. This version takes advantage of the console's larger internal memory to improve load times and includes higher quality graphics, DualSense controller rumble support, and improved audio. With the completion of the PlayStation 5 version, an Xbox version is now in active development.

Development of Endwalker was delayed by the COVID-19 pandemic. Square Enix moved to remote work in April 2020 due to the state of emergency declared in Tokyo. One major obstacle was the inability to connect to internal servers remotely for bug testing. The quality assurance team reconfigured the office to adhere to social distancing guidelines. Development was back at 90% efficiency by June 2020. Endwalker was originally planned for a Q3 2021 release but it was ultimately delayed to Q4 2021.

Expansions for Final Fantasy XIV are traditionally announced at Fan Festival, a biennial convention that takes place in Japan, North America, and Europe. However, these events were cancelled due to the COVID-19 pandemic. In their place, Square Enix announced the expansion at an online showcase in February 2021 and released additional information at a digital "Fan Festival Around the World" in May 2021. The latter encompassed livestreams of concerts and panel interviews with developers as well as in-game events. Yoshida chose the timing of the digital Fan Festival to fall in between the two story-based updates in Patch 5.5 of Shadowbringers to encourage speculation about the plot of Endwalker.

Yoshida described the story for Endwalker as the conclusion to the "Hydaelyn–Zodiark arc" that began with A Realm Reborn in 2013. The decision to conclude the long-running arc came about after the success of 2017's Stormblood expansion secured greater funding for the title as a whole. Unlike previous expansions where the main story continues in content added in patches, the primary conflict of Endwalker was resolved within the expansion itself and the patch content will debut a new story arc. The development team has a preliminary road map for at least five years of content beyond Endwalker.

Shadowbringers introduced Viera and Hrothgar as playable races to the game. However, due to time and resource constraints, only one gender of each was made available at the time. Endwalker debuted with male Viera, while female Hrothgar will become available at a later date. The development team was able to implement these additions using 30% time to address the tremendous desire for them. The team has also included more hairstyle options for both Viera and Hrothgar, as well as more to come in the future.

Patches

Music

Masayoshi Soken composed the majority of the expansion's score in addition to his duties as sound director. Due to his health issues, Nobuo Uematsu was asked to prioritize his other projects and did not contribute to the soundtrack. At Fan Festival 2021, Soken revealed that he had been in treatment for cancer since March 2020 and had hidden his diagnosis from most of the development team. With Yoshida's support, he arranged for materials to be brought to his hospital so he could compose while in treatment. He credited his recovery to composing as if "nothing had changed", which gave him something to live for. As of May 2021, he is almost in full remission and his doctor cleared him to perform at Fan Festival. The main theme of the game, "Footfalls", incorporates elements from grunge and shoegaze. It also quotes musical phrases and lyrics from each of the previous expansions' main themes to highlight Endwalker status as the conclusion of a long-running story arc. Sam Carter of Architects provided the main vocals with Amanda Achen, who had performed on Shadowbringers, on background vocals.

In December 2021, musician Sia covered "Fly Me to the Moon" as a tie-in promotion because of the game's focus on the moon. This cover features elements of "Prelude", a theme included in many entries of the Final Fantasy series.

Reception 

Endwalker received "universal acclaim" for the PC and PlayStation 5 version according to review aggregator Metacritic.

Chris Carter of Destructoid praised the title for being a "joy to progress through from start to finish", lauding the lack of boring fetch quests and the quality of life improvements. GameSpot noted the game's excellent dungeon and trial designs and its earnest storytelling while criticizing the plot's pacing issues for feeling too rushed and bloated at the same time. GamesRadar+ called the expansion a "landmark achievement in narrative development" and cited it as cementing Final Fantasy XIV as "one of the best Final Fantasy games ever made." Leif Johnson of IGN praised the title's ability to deliver enriching content despite its aging resources, writing, "Packed with hours of meaningful cutscenes and unforgettable new zones, Endwalker marks a satisfying conclusion to Final Fantasy XIV's story as it has existed to date." PC Gamer called the two new added jobs "terrific fun" and the narrative both "ambitious" and "messy", saying that the expansion "represent[ed] FF14's development team at their peak."

Notes

References

External links

 

2021 video games
Final Fantasy video games
Endwalker
Japanese role-playing video games
Massively multiplayer online role-playing games
PlayStation 4 games
PlayStation 5 games
Role-playing video games
Square Enix games
Video game expansion packs
Video games developed in Japan
Video games scored by Masayoshi Soken
Windows games
Interactive Achievement Award winners
Video games set on the Moon
D.I.C.E. Award for Role-Playing Game of the Year winners
D.I.C.E. Award for Online Game of the Year winners